Ted Craig FRSA (born 20 April 1948) is an Australian-born theatre director lately the artistic director of the Warehouse Theatre, South London, England.

Biography 
Craig was born and educated in Melbourne, Australia.  He worked in Australian television as a director for four years, as well as an actor (Best Supporting Actor, 1964 Adelaide Festival of Arts). He travelled to England in 1964, where he joined the Crewe repertory company, and went on to act and direct at Crewe, Richmond, Folkestone, and Harrogate. He served as the resident artistic director at Crewe Theatre for three years, before taking over from Christopher Denys as the new artistic director at the Connaught, Worthing. Since then he has directed theatre productions all over the UK, Europe, the United States, Asia and Australia, including the directorship of the Drama Theatre of the Sydney Opera House. His freelance productions have included the Off-Broadway production of Look Back in Anger with Malcolm McDowell (1980, Roundabout Theatre); Shakespeare's The Tempest, Congreve's Love for Love, Molière's The Misanthrope, Feydeau's The Lady from Maxim's all at the Sydney Opera House; Tarantara, Tarantara! by Ian Taylor (Theatre Royal, Sydney and Australian tour), the Australian première of The Elephant Man by Bernard Pomerance (Melbourne Theatre Company); and Arthur Miller's The Last Yankee and Joe Orton's Entertaining Mr Sloane (Theatro Ena, Cyprus).

From 1985 to 2012, Craig was the Artistic Director of the Warehouse Theatre, Croydon, London, and his productions included The Astronomer's Garden by Kevin Hood (Warehouse Theatre and Royal Court Theatre), Playing Sinatra by Bernard Kops (Warehouse Theatre and Greenwich Theatre), Sugar Hill Blues by Kevin Hood (Warehouse Theatre and Hampstead Theatre).  He is also co-founder (with Steve Gooch) of the annual International Playwriting Festival, which takes place yearly. Other productions include Blood Royal by Charles Thomas at the Kings Head Theatre, Islington; Richard Vincent's Skin Deep; Sara Mason's The Kindness of Strangers with Susannah York;, George Parsons' Being Olivia. and the London revival of The Mystery of Edwin Drood by Rupert Holmes. Also for the Warehouse, he commissioned the Dick Barton - Special Agent series (based on the BBC Radio series) and directed all nine episodes. Following the withdrawal of funding by Croydon Council in 2012, the Warehouse Theatre Company was forced into Administration and its future and the Warehouse Theatre building are now at risk.

He is a Fellow of the Royal Society of Arts.

References

External links 
 
  Information about Ted Craig
 Information about Warehouse Theatre history, including listing of plays directed by Craig
 Information from playwrights database

Australian artistic directors
British artistic directors
Australian theatre directors
British theatre directors
Culture in the London Borough of Croydon
Living people
Theatre directors from Melbourne
1948 births